The 2005 Zenit St.Petersburg season was the club's eleventh season in the Russian Premier League, the highest tier of association football in Russia.

Squad

Transfers

In

Out

Loans out

Competitions

Overall record

Premier League

Results by round

Results

Table

Russian Cup

2004/05

2005/06

Round 16 took place during the 2006 season.

UEFA Cup

Qualifying rounds

First round

Group stage

Squad statistics

Appearances and goals

|-
|colspan="14"|Players who away on loan:

|-
|colspan="14"|Players who left Zenit during the season:

|}

Goal Scorers

Clean sheets

Disciplinary record

References

FC Zenit Saint Petersburg seasons
Zenit St.Petersburg